The Surtees Society is a text publication society and registered charity (No. 1003812) based in Durham in northern England. The society was established on 27 May 1834 by James Raine, following the death (on 11 February) of the renowned County Durham antiquarian Robert Surtees. Raine and other former friends of Surtees created the society to honour his memory and carry on his legacy, with the focus on publishing documents relating to the region between the River Humber and Firth of Forth in the east and the River Mersey and the River Clyde in the west, the region that had once constituted the kingdom of Northumbria. Membership of the Society is by annual subscription (currently £25). Members receive the book published for the year of subscription.

History
The Surtees Society was constituted on 27 May 1834 at a meeting held at Durham, and Raine was appointed its first secretary. It was modelled in part on the Scottish Bannatyne Club (founded c. 1823) and Maitland Club (founded 1828). At the 27 May meeting, 94 members were elected, and by 1 July the number had risen to 100. From this time Raine devoted great energy and industry to the interests of the society, editing 17 of its volumes, and establishing it on a permanent basis. It proved the pioneer of many similar English regional and county publishing societies, which adopted its rules and methods.

Between 1855 and 1895 the society's secretary was Raine's son, James Raine the younger.

Publications
As of 2021, the society has published 226 volumes, mainly concerning the counties of Durham and Northumberland. Included among the works published are volumes covering the documents of monasteries, including Finchale Priory, Coldingham Priory, Fountains Abbey, Hexham Priory, Whitby Abbey and Brinkburn Priory. 

Other records include wills and inventories from Yorkshire, obituaries from Durham Cathedral, heraldic visitations, documents from various archbishops of York and bishops of Durham, and records from the cities of York and Durham. 

The society has also published editions of the Lindisfarne Gospels and the Lindisfarne Psalter. In recent years it has published three volumes of material relating to Cumberland or Westmorland (including the cartulary of Lanercost Priory) jointly with the Cumberland and Westmorland Antiquarian and Archaeological Society. 

Publications are distributed by Boydell & Brewer.

Officers

Presidents

Secretaries

Treasurers

Editors

References

Bibliography

Attribution

External links
 
 Royal Historical Society listing of Surtees Society publications

Durham University
History of County Durham
History of Northumberland
History of Cumbria
Learned societies of the United Kingdom
Organizations established in 1834
1834 establishments in the United Kingdom
Text publication societies
Surtees Society